Daniel Lorenz Salthenius (March 16, 1701 – January 29, 1750) was a professor of theology at the University of Königsberg from 1732 until his death.

Salthenius was born in Markim between Stockholm and Uppsala, Sweden, the son of a pastor. He studied at the university in his birthplace, as well as University of Halle, and became a noted Pietist. He was appointed to his post at Königsberg to help the Pietist cause there.

Salthenius's orthodox Lutheran opponents accused him of having made a pact with the Devil when he was  a student in Uppsala. He wrote a letter in his own blood, asking the Devil to provide him with a bottomless bag of money in exchange for his body and soul, and placed the letter under an oak tree, where it was found by a farmer who notified the authorities. 
However, Salthenius was not dismissed from the university and remained a full professor. The letter is today kept at Uppsala University library.

References

1701 births
1750 deaths
18th-century German Protestant theologians
Academic staff of the University of Königsberg
Uppsala University alumni
Swedish theologians
18th-century Protestant theologians
German male non-fiction writers